The Hate Man (born Mark Hawthorne, September 26, 1936April 2, 2017) was an American philosopher, activist, and former reporter for The New York Times. His beliefs centered on people being honest about their negative feelings.

He was locally famous in Berkeley, California, where he lived since 1973. In the late 1970s he was a regular presence in upper Sproul Plaza on the University of California, Berkeley campus, and often gave speeches in Leopold's fountain.  In addition to being known as "Hate Man", he was also called "Berkeley Baby".

Career 

Hawthorne was born in Maryland, raised in Stamford, Connecticut and graduated from Stamford High School in 1954 and from the University of Connecticut in 1958 with a Bachelor of Arts in English. While at UCONN he was Managing Editor of The Daily Campus, the University newspaper. Hawthorne was also a member of ROTC and received his commission in the United States Air Force upon graduation, subsequently serving at a Strategic Air Command base in Morocco. He also served as a Peace Corps volunteer. He started at The New York Times as a copy boy and worked as a reporter in the Metro section from 1961 to 1970 before he quit his job, divorced his wife, and "started being downward mobile".

Philosophy 

Hawthorne created a philosophy he called oppositionality, which is centered on treating people kindly even though one is in a bad mood. The reason he greeted people with, "I hate you," he explained, is because saying "I love you" is too often used as a form of manipulation.  He created his own following. The group has a practice, initiated by Hawthorne, of pushing one another for what they want. Hawthorne indicated that this is about feeling out the other person's energy and communicating something to the other person about "where they are coming from".  The idea is to avoid negative conflict by bringing such differences out in the open, rather than creating situations where people rob or con one another for what they want. For a couple of years, he initiated a nightly "hate camp" drum circle at Sproul Plaza, where local people released their animosity. "Hate camp" was known as the camp that formed around him. Camping there made you a "hate camper", with a "true hate camper" being someone who believed in the camp and took an active role in helping the community it created.

A documentary about his life and philosophy entitled The Hate Man, Street Philosopher was released in August 2017.

Personal life 

Hawthorne was married, but later divorced. He was homeless by choice. He died on April 2, 2017, at the age of 80. He also had two daughters.

See also

References 

20th-century American philosophers
21st-century American philosophers
1936 births
2017 deaths
Culture of Berkeley, California
People from Maryland
Writers from Stamford, Connecticut
Street people
United States Air Force officers
University of Connecticut alumni
Writers from Berkeley, California
Writers from Washington, D.C.
Military personnel from California